"Ex-Factor" is a song recorded by American recording artist Lauryn Hill for her debut solo studio album The Miseducation of Lauryn Hill (1998). Written and produced by Hill herself, it incorporates elements of R&B, neo soul and hip hop soul. The song features a sample of "Can It Be All So Simple" by Wu-Tang Clan. It has been claimed to be about Hill's former Fugees groupmate Wyclef Jean. The song was released as the second single from The Miseducation of Lauryn Hill on December 8, 1998, by Ruffhouse Records and Columbia Records. 

Upon its release, "Ex-Factor" received widespread critical acclaim. The song peaked at number 21 on the US Billboard Hot 100 and at number seven on the Hot R&B/Hip-Hop Songs. Internationally, it peaked within the top five in Iceland and the United Kingdom. It won the Best R&B/Soul Single - Female award at the 2000 Soul Train Music Awards. Spin named it the third best single of 1999. In 2020, The Ringer ranked it as the 18th greatest breakup song of all time. Since its release, the song has been sampled and covered by numerous artists.

Music and lyrics
"Ex-Factor" was written and produced by Lauryn Hill and it features replayed elements of "Can It Be All So Simple" by Wu-Tang Clan, which itself samples Gladys Knight & the Pips' cover of Barbra Streisand's "The Way We Were".

"Ex-Factor" is a soul number which serves as a painful dissection of a failing relationship. The accompaniment is driven by two-chord progressions all throughout its melodic variations. Its refrain contains soaring harmonies.

Commercial performance
"Ex-Factor", although not as successful as Hill's previous single "Doo Wop (That Thing)", still entered several international charts. It spent 22 weeks on the US Billboard Hot 100, peaking at number 21 on the chart dated April 10, 1999. The song peaked atop the US R&B/Hip-Hop Airplay. It also charted on the US Hot R&B/Hip-Hop Songs, spending 31 weeks and peaking at number seven on March 13, 1999. It reached number four on the UK Singles Chart and spent 16 weeks on the chart, remaining Hill's biggest hit in the United Kingdom to date.

Legacy
Since its release, "Ex-Factor" has been sampled by numerous artists in their songs, including rapper Lil B's "Money Over Suckas" (2012), singer Kehlani's "Till the Morning" (2014), singer Omarion's "Show Me" (2014) featuring Jeremih, rapper Drake's "Nice for What" (2018), and rapper Cardi B's  "Be Careful" (2018). Additionally, it has been covered by Beyoncé, Kelly Clarkson, John Legend, and H.E.R.

Track listings and formats

 US 7-inch single
A. "Ex-Factor" (radio edit) – 4:38
B. "When It Hurts So Bad" (album version) – 5:42

 UK CD1
 "Ex-Factor" (album version) – 5:27
 "Ex-Factor" (Part II remix) – 4:38
 "Ex-Factor" (A Simple Mix) – 4:37

 UK CD2
 "Ex-Factor" (radio edit) – 4:38
 "Ex-Factor" (A Simple Breakdown) – 4:10
 "Lost Ones" (remix) – 4:17

 UK cassette single
 "Ex-Factor"
 "Can't Take My Eyes Off You"

 European CD1
 "Ex-Factor" (radio edit) – 4:38
 "Ex-Factor" (A Simple Mix) – 4:37

 European CD2
 "Ex-Factor" (radio edit) – 4:38
 "Ex-Factor" (A Simple Breakdown) – 4:10
 "Lost Ones" – 4:17
 "Ex-Factor" (A Simple Mix) – 4:37

Credits and personnel
Credits are adapted from The Miseducation of Lauryn Hill liner notes.

 Leads and background vocals: Lauryn Hill
 Additional background: Chuck Young
 Bass: Paul Fakhourie
 Piano: Tejumold Newton
 Wurlitzer, organ and rhodes: James Poyser
 Percussion: Rudy Byrd
 Guitar: Johari Newton
 Drum programming by Vada Nobles

 Recorded by Commissioner Gordon
 Mixed by Commissioner Gordon
 Assistant recording engineer: Chip Verspyck
 Assistant mix engineer: Greg Thompson
 Recorded at RPM Studios, (NYC), Marley Music, Inc. (Kingston, Jamaica) and Chung King Studios (NYC)
 Mixed at Hit Factory Studios and Chung King Studios (NYC)

Charts

Weekly charts

Year-end charts

Certifications

Release history

Notes

References

External links
 

1990s ballads
1998 singles
Contemporary R&B ballads
Holly Miranda songs
Lauryn Hill songs
Song recordings produced by Lauryn Hill
Songs about heartache
Songs written by Lauryn Hill
Soul ballads